Gur-e Hasanali (also Romanized as Gūr-e Ḩāsan‘alī, Gūr-e Ḩāsan ‘Alī, and Gūr Ḩasan ‘Alī) is a village in Hoseyniyeh Rural District, Alvar-e Garmsiri District, Andimeshk County, Khuzestan Province, Iran. At the 2006 census, its population was 74, in 15 families.

References 

Populated places in Andimeshk County